Neyha Mukta Sharma  is a theater, Bollywood and television actor. She was active at a theater group in Shankar Market, Delhi and had done many plays. She holds a PG Diploma in Creative Photography as well and has learned from Raghu Rai. In 2018, her short film came out which was jointly release by Farhan Akhtar Feroz Abbas Khan and Population Foundation of India on YouTube. The film is directed by Ranjeeta Kaur, which gathered over one millions views in a short span of time.

Filmography

References

https://www.tellychakkar.com/tv/tv-news/neyha-sharma-be-seen-web-series-beycharey-reveals-exclusive-details-200220%3famp

https://www.indiaforums.com/article/neyha-sharma-bags-a-role-in-webseries-beycharey_160615

External links

21st-century Indian actresses
Actresses from Uttar Pradesh
Indian film actresses
Indian stage actresses
Living people
Year of birth missing (living people)
People from Moradabad